FM sound broadcasting began in the United Kingdom on 2 May 1955 when the BBC started an FM broadcasting service the Light Programme, the Third Programme and the Home Service to the south east of England. There are now over 40 BBC and over 250 commercial FM sound broadcasting stations in the United Kingdom.

BBC 
The BBC began using FM sound broadcasting in 1955, but at that time AM sound broadcasting predominated. The BBC's 'popular music' station known as Radio 1 opened on AM in 1967 and left medium wave in 1994, but had been using FM full-time for six years previously, part-time before 1988. Currently, all but one of the BBC's analogue services, including Radios 1, 2, 3, and 4 and BBC Local Radio are provided on FM, although Radio 4 uses medium wave in some areas, long wave for national broadcasting; Local Radio broadcasts opt-outs on medium wave. The only analogue service not to use FM is Radio 5 Live. BBC policy was to refer to FM as VHF on air until 30 September 1984 when FM became its official term.

Commercial broadcasting 

Legal commercial broadcasting began in the United Kingdom in 1973, with the launch of LBC, though offshore pirate radio stations operated in the 1960s to 1990s, usually from ships anchored off the coast of Britain.

Early licences were granted to wide-area stations, such as Capital Radio which served London and the home counties. Later more local stations were introduced. There is also one national commercial radio station, Classic FM.

Commercial radio stations simulcasted on both FM and medium wave from the beginning until the IBA asked radio stations to end the practice and from 1988 stations began to offer separate stations on each waveband. Typically another service, often a 'gold' format, was introduced on AM and the original service continued on FM.

Frequency utilisation 
From 1955 the band 88.0 – 94.6 MHz was used (allotted and assigned) for three BBC national networks. Over the next 40 years, the band grew piecemeal to 87.5 – 108.0 MHz, allowing for five national networks and many local stations.

Until 1995, parts of the band had been used in the United Kingdom for mobile service by police, fire brigades and the fuel and power industries. These parts were reassigned to broadcasting service gradually over many years as the communications services were transferred to new equipment in other parts of the spectrum.

The current frequency allotment plan is based on an ITU agreement made in Geneva in 1984. The table below shows which kind of broadcasting transmitter stations are the main users of each part of the band. There are many exceptions. In some areas there is some commercial usage of the 'BBC local' sub bands while in Scotland, Wales and Northern Ireland the 'Radio 4' and 'BBC Local' ranges are used interchangeably. Community radio stations and RSLs tend to be fitted into any locally-available position.

Subcarriers 
The United Kingdom permits Radio Data System (RDS) subcarriers.

Future switch off 
The UK government is planning for a switchover from FM to digital radio once take-up and coverage meets certain criteria. Successive governments have admitted that FM VHF Band II analogue radio would not cease until the majority use digital, so no actual date has ever been agreed. Digital listening figures however consistently include satellite, DTT and online streaming, not just DAB. In any case there is a commitment to maintain community FM radio. This means that as long as there are significant numbers of listeners on FM in the United Kingdom no government is likely to take the politically unpopular decision to turn off analogue. Support for the FM switch off in the UK is limited. In July 2020, provided the stations also broadcast on digital radio, UK government has decided to allow Ofcom to renew analogue FM and AM licences for a further ten-year period.

References 

Radio in the United Kingdom